Nixon is the fifth studio album by American rock band Lambchop. It was released on February 7, 2000 and was issued by Merge Records and City Slang.

Nixon became a breakthrough release for Lambchop in the United Kingdom, where it received critical acclaim and was named among the best albums of 2000 by numerous publications.

Composition
Nixon has been described as a merging of chamber pop, countrypolitan, and R&B sounds alongside "sweet" soul music.

Artwork and title
The title Nixon alludes to Richard Nixon and was derived from the album's cover artwork, which is a painting by Wayne White, a friend of Lambchop frontman Kurt Wagner. "He always plays around with slogans or words. He considered the material on the Nixon album to be tragicomic, and an image of Nixon came to mind," Wagner explained.

Release
Nixon was released on February 7, 2000 by Lambchop's European label City Slang, and on February 8, 2000 by the band's American label Merge Records. It peaked at number 60 on the UK Albums Chart. "Up with People" was released as a single from the album on May 2, 2000, reaching number 66 on the UK Singles Chart. According to The Guardians John Aizlewood, Nixon established Lambchop as "standard bearers" for alternative country music, and "proved that the genre could be commercially viable if it painted its off-kilter pictures of redemption and loss in glorious Technicolor rather than mealy-mouthed monochrome."

Critical reception

Nixon was released to highly positive reviews from music critics, receiving a score of 84 out of 100 on the review aggregation website Metacritic, indicating "universal acclaim". The album was particularly well received by the British music press. NME critic Gavin Martin deemed it Lambchop's best record and said that its "sheer sonorous delight" justified comparisons to The Beach Boys' 1966 album Pet Sounds, while Allan Jones of Uncut praised Nixon as "one of the first great records of the new millennium". At the end of 2000, Nixon was named one of the year's best albums by numerous British publications, including Uncut (who ranked it as the best album of 2000), Mojo, NME, and Q.

Nixon was later included in the book 1001 Albums You Must Hear Before You Die.

Track listing

Personnel
Credits are adapted from the album's liner notes.

Lambchop
 Paul Burch – vibraphone, arrangements
 C. Scott Chase – "open end wrenches", "lacquer thinner can", arrangements
 Dennis Cronin – trumpet, cornet, backing vocals, arrangements
 John Delworth – Hammond B-3 organ, Rhodes piano, Juno synthesizer, arrangements
 Allen Lowrey – drums, arrangements
 Jonathan Marx – trumpet, backing vocals, arrangements
 Alex McManus – electric guitar, arrangements
 Mark Nevers – atmospheric guitar, electric guitar, arrangements
 Paul Niehaus – pedal steel guitar, Fender Telecaster guitar, backing vocals, arrangements
 Matt Swanson – bass guitar, arrangements
 Marc Trovillion – bass guitar, arrangements
 Deanna Varagona – baritone saxophone, backing vocals, arrangements
 Kurt Wagner – vocals, 1946 Gibson L-7 guitar, Juno synthesizer, arrangements

Additional musicians
 Matt Bach – bass guitar
 Lloyd Barry – string arrangements
 Paul Booker – electric guitar
 Ken Coomer – additional percussion
 Tony Crow – piano
 Nashville String Machine – strings
 Sanchez – choral arrangements

Production
 Brady Barnett – editing
 Dennis Cronin – recording (assistant)
 Tommy Dorsey – mastering
 Brian Miles – recording (assistant)
 Mark Nevers – production, mixing, recording
 David Streit – recording (assistant)
 Kurt Wagner – production, mixing

Design
 Eric Bailey – design
 Wayne White – cover painting

Charts

References

External links
 

2000 albums
Lambchop (band) albums
Merge Records albums
City Slang albums